The European Association for Architectural Education / Association Européenne pour l'Enseignement de l'Architecture (EAAE/AEEA) is a non-profit bilingual (English/French) association that, since 1975, is trying to increase the knowledge and the quality of architectural and urban design education, for the benefit of teachers, students, citizens, and society.  Today, the association counts among its members over 140 European and international schools of architecture, representing some 5000 teaching staff and over 120,000 students.

EAAE/AEEA Charter for Architectural Research
The Charter for Architectural Research is intended as a reference document for the use of universities, architecture schools, research institutions, funding agencies, and professional practices that are undertaking architectural research. It specifies the character and objectives of architectural research, confirms the variety of valid methodologies and supports the development of a vibrant, internationally recognized and well funded research community.

The Charter, produced by the EAAE/AEEA Research Committee between 2009 and 2011, consists of two distinct parts : A short "Declaration" approved at the General Assembly in September 2011, and a more detailed "Framework" document, on which work is ongoing, and concerning which comments are of course invited from the community of educators and researchers in architecture.

Declaration on Architectural Research
Architecture is about the creation, transformation and interpretation of the built environment and the articulation of space at various scales. It is a discipline involving art, design, conservation, planning, management, construction and representation, addressing issues of ethics, aesthetics, culture and society. The discipline of architecture engages with the cultural, socio-economic and environmental conditions affecting our quality of life.

Architecture is facing challenges of climate change, globalisation, urbanisation and social transformation that necessitate vital research. In parallel, the horizons of architectural experimentation are expanding rapidly with the development of new technologies and media. If we are to understand, explain, anticipate and influence the consequences of these changes, research is essential. Moreover, research is essential for the continued expansion of the discipline’s knowledge base and improvement in teaching, learning and practice of architecture.

The EAAE/AEEA confirms that architectural research has a particular knowledge base, tools and methods; it confirms the trans-disciplinary nature of architectural research and the legitimacy of a wide range of approaches. Architecture tackles various dimensions of the built environment in a specifically integrative way; the EAAE/AEEA calls for recognition of all appropriate areas and modes of architectural research, for better definition of context and scope and acknowledges research by design as part of the diversity of valid methods with which to research, practice and study architecture.

The generic expectations of originality, rigour and significance apply to all genres of architectural research. Valid architectural research outputs are as varied as the constantly growing range of research approaches and the EAAE/AEEA recognises installations, experimental projects, proposals, models and actual buildings as such, in addition to written and graphic research outputs. Peer review, communication and international dissemination are crucial and should relate to the nature of the research.

The EAAE/AEEA advocates stronger links between theoretical and practice-based research and therefore between academia and the profession in the establishment of an expanded arena of architectural research.

See the latest PDF version of the Declaration on the EAAE/AEEA Research webspace

Framework on Architectural Research
See the latest PDF version of the Framework on the EAAE/AEEA Research webspace

References 

Architectural education
Architecture-related professional associations
Building research
European student organizations